The 2014–15 season was Real Sociedad's 68th season in La Liga. This article shows player statistics and all matches (official and friendly) that the club played during the 2014–15 season.

Season summary
In the summer of 2014, Antoine Griezmann was sold to Atlético Madrid while top forward Carlos Vela missed the early stages of the season due to fitness issues. Most performances during pre-season were poor. Real Sociedad faced Scottish side Aberdeen in the UEFA Europa League Third qualifying round. Real Socieded progressed 5–2 on aggregate, although the second leg, away from home, was far from convincing. In the next round, Real Sociedad were emphatically beaten by Russian club Krasnodar. In addition, Gerónimo Rulli suffered a serious injury on his debut.

The early months of the Liga season followed the same pattern. In early November, Real Sociedad found themselves second from bottom, prompting the club to relieve Jagoba Arrasate of his duties after just the tenth matchday. Soon after his dismissal, former Everton and Manchester United manager David Moyes was announced as the replacement. The Scotsman led the club out of the lower zone of the table and a strong series of results during February and March dispelled fears of relegation. In April, results worsened again, with the club ultimately ending the season in 12th.

In the Copa del Rey, Real Sociedad eliminated Real Oviedo but fell short against their next opponents, Villarreal.

Others
In the summer of 2014, Real Sociedad reached an agreement with sportswear manufacturers Adidas which, on 1 July, became the official suppliers of the team's kit and training clothing for all categories from youth to the first team squad.

On 11 August, Real Sociedad announced an agreement with Qbao.com in which the Chinese company became the club's main sponsor. As part of the new collaboration, the Qbao.com logo was displayed on the first team shirt during the 2014–15 season. The agreement was later renewed until 2020.

Real Sociedad reached an agreement with Spanish telecommunications provider Telefónica for the lease of audio-visual rights for the team's league matches for the 2015–16 season.

On 10 December, it was announced that Carlos Vela was named La Liga Player of the Month for November.

Squad

Start formations
Starting XI
Lineup that started most of the club's competitive matches throughout the league.

Player transfers

In

Out

Pre-season

Competitions

Overall

La Liga

League table

Results by round

Matches
Kickoff times are in CET.

UEFA Europa League

Third qualifying round

Play-off round

Copa del Rey

Round of 32

Round of 16

Statistics

Appearances and goals
Last updated on 23 May 2015.

|-
! colspan=14 style=background:#dcdcdc; text-align:center|Goalkeepers

|-
! colspan=14 style=background:#dcdcdc; text-align:center|Defenders

|-
! colspan=14 style=background:#dcdcdc; text-align:center|Midfielders

|-
! colspan=14 style=background:#dcdcdc; text-align:center|Forwards

|-
! colspan=14 style=background:#dcdcdc; text-align:center| Players who have made an appearance or had a squad number this season but have left the club

|}

References

External links
Club's official website

Real Sociedad
Real Sociedad seasons